Quentin Jaurégui (born 22 April 1994) is a French cyclist, who currently rides for French amateur team Dunkerque Grand Littoral.

Career
Jaurégui was born in Cambrai. In 2012, Jaurégui won a bronze medal in the junior race at the UCI Cyclo-cross World Championships in Koksijde, Belgium. On 3 May 2015, he won the one-day race Grand Prix de la Somme by beating Anthony Delaplace and Alo Jakin in a contest of three. He was named in the startlist for the 2016 Vuelta a España and the startlist for the 2017 Giro d'Italia.

Major results

2010
 3rd  Junior race, UEC European Cyclo-cross Championships
2011
 2nd  Junior race, UEC European Cyclo-cross Championships
 2nd Junior race, National Cyclo-cross Championships
2012
 1st  Junior race, National Cyclo-cross Championships
 1st  Overall Grand Prix Général Patton
1st Points classification
1st Stage 1
 3rd  Junior race, UCI Cyclo-cross World Championships
2014
 1st Stage 1 Rhône-Alpes Isère Tour
 3rd Polynormande
 7th Tour du Finistère
2015
 1st Grand Prix de la Somme
2016
 1st  Mountains classification Route du Sud
2017
 3rd Tour du Doubs
2018
 3rd Paris–Chauny
 8th Overall Circuit de la Sarthe
 10th Tour de Vendée
2019
 2nd Boucles de l'Aulne
 3rd Paris–Camembert
2022
 1st Stage 2 Alpes Isère Tour

Grand Tour general classification results timeline

References

External links

1994 births
Living people
French male cyclists
People from Cambrai
French people of Basque descent
Sportspeople from Nord (French department)
Cyclists from Hauts-de-France
21st-century French people